Keilaniemi (Finnish) or Kägeludden (Swedish) is an underground station  on the western metro extension (Länsimetro) of the Helsinki Metro. The station is located beside the Fortum head office. It is the easternmost metro station in Espoo, going east to Koivusaari metro station crosses the border to Helsinki. The station is located 1,4 kilometres southeast from Aalto University metro station and 2,3 kilometres west from Koivusaari metro station.

References

External links
 
Länsimetro work in progress

Helsinki Metro stations
2017 establishments in Finland